This article includes lists of all Olympic medalists since 1896, organized by each Olympic sport or discipline, and also by Olympiad.

Medalist with most medals by sport

Summer Olympic sports

Winter Olympic sports

A. Including military patrol event at 1924 Games, which IOC now refers to biathlon.
B. Figure skating was held at the 1908 and 1920 Summer Olympic games prior to the establishment of the Winter Olympics. 21 medals (seven of each color) were awarded in seven events.
C. A men's ice hockey tournament was held at the 1920 Summer Olympics, and then added as a Winter Olympics event. Three medals were awarded.

Discontinued summer sports

Medalist with most medals by Olympiad

Summer Olympic Games

D. The IOC overview web page for the 1900 Olympic Games gives a figure of 96 events, while the IOC database for the 1900 Olympic Games lists 95.
E. The IOC overview web page for the 1904 Olympic Games gives a figure of 95 events; the IOC database for the 1904 Olympic Games also lists 95.
F. The IOC overview web page for the 1920 Olympic Games gives a figure of 156 events; the IOC database for the 1920 Olympic Games also lists 156.
G. Due to Australian quarantine laws, 6 equestrian events were held in Stockholm several months before the rest of the 1956 Games in Melbourne.
H. The IOC overview web page for the 1956 Olympic Games gives a figure of 151 events; (145 events in Melbourne and 6 equestrian events in Stockholm).

Winter Olympic Games

Medalists by age

By sport

By Olympiad

See also
 List of sport awards
 List of multiple Olympic gold medalists
 List of multiple Olympic gold medalists at a single Games
 List of multiple Olympic gold medalists in one event
 List of multiple Olympic medalists
 List of multiple Olympic medalists at a single Games
 List of multiple Olympic medalists in one event
 List of Olympians who won medals in the Summer and Winter Games
 List of athletes with the most appearances at Olympic Games
 Lists of Paralympic medalists
 List of Olympic medalists in art competitions

References
General
 
 

Specific

External links
 Olympic Review and Revue Olympique. LA84 Foundation

 
Medalists, Lists
Lists of Olympic competitors
Olympic Games medal tables